Pierre-Marie Hilaire (born 19 November 1965 in Deshaies, Guadeloupe) is a French athlete who specializes in the 300 and 400 meters. Hilaire competed at the 1995 World Championships in Athletics .

References 
 sports reference

French male sprinters
Guadeloupean male sprinters
French people of Guadeloupean descent
Living people
Athletes (track and field) at the 2000 Summer Olympics
Olympic athletes of France
1965 births
European Athletics Championships medalists
World Athletics Championships athletes for France
Mediterranean Games gold medalists for France
Mediterranean Games medalists in athletics
Athletes (track and field) at the 1993 Mediterranean Games
World Athletics Indoor Championships medalists